Circe is a 1945 opera by Werner Egk after Pedro Calderón de la Barca, premiered 1948. Egk reworked it as an opera semibuffa as 17 Tage und 4 Minuten, 1966.

References

1945 operas
German-language operas
Operas by Werner Egk
Operas
Operas based on works by Pedro Calderón de la Barca